Elisabeth Tichy-Fisslberger, or Elisabeth Fisslberger, (born 1957) is an Austrian lawyer, translator and diplomat who was the first Austrian to serve as president of the United Nations Human Rights Council for 2020.

Early life and education
Tichy-Fisslberger was born in Vienna in 1957. She studied law at the University of Vienna whilst also studying French and Spanish translation. She gained a scholarship to study in Belgium at the Université catholique de Louvain.

Career
Tichy-Fisslberger was elected chair of the United Nations Human Rights Council in December 2019 to serve in 2020. The Austrian Minister of Foreign Affairs, Alexander Schallenberg, noted that her appointment was a recognition of her country's human rights efforts. She was the first Austrian to hold this position in the United Nations. She took over the position from Coly Seck of Senegal who had held the position in 2019. Her vice-Presidents were Ambassadors Nasir Ahmad Andisha of Afghanistan, Togo's Yackoley Kokou Johnson, Mexico's Socorro Flores Liera and Slovakia's Juraj Podhorsky.

Other activities
 International Gender Champions (IGC), Member

References

1957 births
Living people
Lawyers from Vienna
Permanent Representatives of Austria to the United Nations
Austrian women ambassadors
Austrian people of Czech descent
Diplomats from Vienna